John Edzerza (August 14, 1948 – November 25, 2011) was a Canadian politician. He represented the electoral district of McIntyre-Takhini in the Yukon Legislative Assembly.

Political career

Born in British Columbia in 1948, he first entered politics in 2002 as a Yukon Party MLA, and served as Minister of Justice and Minister of Education in Dennis Fentie's cabinet.

After disagreeing with a number of government decisions in early 2006, he resigned from the Yukon Party on August 2, 2006, to sit as an independent MLA, and recontested his seat in that fall's territorial election as a candidate of the Yukon New Democratic Party. He was re-elected, and served in the NDP caucus under Todd Hardy until January 2009, when he resigned from the NDP to sit again as an independent. He rejoined the Yukon Party on October 22, 2009, and served as Minister of the Environment until retiring in 2011. Edzerza died of leukemia on November 25, 2011.

Electoral record

Yukon general election, 2006

|-

| NDP
| John Edzerza
| align="right"| 336
| align="right"| 38.8%
| align="right"| +7.0%

| Liberal
| Ed Schultz
| align="right"| 328
| align="right"| 37.9%
| align="right"| +15.4%

|-
! align=left colspan=3|Total
! align=right| 865
! align=right| 100.0%
! align=right| –
|}

Yukon general election, 2002

|-

| NDP
| Maureen Stephens
| align="right"| 270
| align="right"| 29.8%
| align="right"| -4.7%

| Liberal
| Judy Gingell
| align="right"| 204
| align="right"| 22.5%
| align="right"| -15.9%

| Independent
| Wayne Jim
| align="right"| 129
| align="right"| 14.2%
| align="right"| +14.2%

| Independent
| Geoffrey Capp
| align="right"| 15
| align="right"| 1.7%
| align="right"| +1.7%
|-
! align=left colspan=3|Total
! align=right| 906
! align=right| 100.0%
! align=right| –
|}

Yukon general election, 2000

|-

| Liberal
| Wayne Jim
| align="right"| 376
| align="right"| 38.4%
| align="right"| +18.1%

| NDP
| Piers McDonald
| align="right"| 338
| align="right"| 34.5%
| align="right"| -14.8%

|-
! align=left colspan=3|Total
! align=right| 979
! align=right| 100.0%
! align=right| –
|}

References

Yukon New Democratic Party MLAs
Independent MLAs in Yukon
Yukon Party MLAs
Politicians from Whitehorse
2011 deaths
Deaths from leukemia
1948 births
21st-century Canadian politicians